Henley High School is a co-educational public secondary school, located in Henley Beach, a suburb of Adelaide, South Australia.

Founded in 1958, the school consists of a middle school transition for years 7, 8 and 9, and SACE and vocational education and training for the senior classes.

Notable alumni 
Nathan Bock, Australian rules footballer
Darcie Brown, cricketer
Paul Caica, politician
Luke Dunstan, Australian rules footballer
Sam Durdin, Australian rules footballer
Cam Ellis-Yolmen, Australian rules footballer
Sam Gray, Australian rules footballer
Brian Lake, Australian rules footballer
Jack Lukosius, Australian rules footballer
Scott Lycett, Australian rules footballer
Stefan Mauk, soccer player
Sam Mayes, Australian rules footballer
Ken McGregor, Australian rules footballer
Lachlan McNeil, Australian rules footballer
Josh Morris, Australian rules footballer
Jared Polec, Australian rules footballer
Caleb Poulter, Australian rules footballer
Izak Rankine, Australian rules footballer
John Rau, politician
Brodie Smith, Australian rules footballer
Phoenix Spicer, Australian rules footballer
Rhys Stanley, Australian rules footballer
Paul Stewart, Australian rules footballer
Steven Stretch, Australian rules footballer
Jay Weatherill, politician

References 

Secondary schools in Adelaide
1958 establishments in Australia
Educational institutions established in 1958